Muskurane is a romantic Hindi song from the 2014 Bollywood film, CityLights. Composed by Jeet Gannguli, the song is sung by Arijit Singh, with lyrics penned by Rashmi Singh. The music video of the track features actors Rajkummar Rao, Patralekha and Arijit Singh.

Background 
The song was composed by Jeet Gannguli with lyrics written by Rashmi Singh. The song was the last composed track from the album. The producer of the song Mukesh Bhatt wanted an 'easy to hum but with depth' melodic song. It was, Ganguly's wife Chandrani who found the composition 'fantastic' while Ganguly was strumming his guitar. Immediately, he called Bhatt and played the 'mukhda' to him which he liked instantly. The following day, Ganguly composed the 'antara' of the song and played it to Bhatt and director of the film Hansal Mehta, which they loved on hearing.

Rashmi Singh wrote the opening lines of the song in a few hours. According to Ganguly "Citylights is not a teenage love story, it's about a couple whose love has depth and character. Rashmi's lyrics are simple, heartfelt and conversational". The song was recorded at Phatbox Studio, Mumbai, at night. The song was recorded in two to three hours.

The song is a guitar-based song which fuse a Bengali folk idiom with modern music in a Sufism touch. Piano was dominantly used in composition of the song with additional use of Violin in the first antara and Esraj in the second antara.

Release and success 
The song was released in Indian Television show Beintehaa which airs on Colors TV, before releasing it on any music channel. It was released on 2 May 2014. The video of the song was officially released on the same day through the YouTube channel of Sony Music India. The video features Arijit Singh as well as select scenes from the film. The full song was also released as a single, the same day.

During the released days, the song was positioned in many charts, and was one of the most downloaded songs during that time.

Critical reception 
The song received positive response from the critics.

Rajiv Vijayakar from Bollywood Hungama praised Singh's rendition in the song for bringing the right haunting tenor and right emotion in the song. Priya Adivarekar reviewing from Indian Express complimented vocals in the song and further stated "The melody is soothing and Rashmi's poetic lyrics perfectly suit the brilliantly-composed romantic track". Joginder Tuteja reviewing for Rediff.com described the song as "lyrical and poetic with a lot of fluidity".

Unplugged Version 
An unplugged version of the song was included in the soundtrack, composed and written by Jeet Gannguli and Rashmi Singh respectively. The song is sung by Mohammad Irfan Ali. The song was released along with other tracks in the soundtrack of the album on 9 May 2014.

Background 
Director of the film, Hansal Mehta wanted to incorporate two versions of the song. The romantic version being sung by Arijit Singh, the composer of the song Jeet Ganguly picked Mohammad Irfan Ali to sing the unplugged version. The song was recorded at Phatbox Studio, Mumbai. The song was recorded in two to three hours.

The lyrics of the song was slightly changed, when compared to the original song. Piano and Violin were used in the composition unlike the version rendered by Singh which used Esraj in the second antara.

Critical reception 
Joginder Tuteja reviewing for Rediff.com felt the version is "equally enjoyable" as of the original. Rajiv Vijayakar from Bollywood Hungama felt this version lacks the 'vital small nuances' in the vocals which make the crucial difference compared to the romantic version of the song, though Priya Adivarekar reviewing from Indian Express felt the version of the song is "also good".

Live performances 
Arijit Singh performed the song "Muskurane" in many of his concerts.

On 29 November 2014, Singh performed the song in The Times of India presented "NOBO – Atif Aslam & Arijit Singh Live in Concert" held in Gurgaon. Singh also performed the song live during his "Tum Hi Ho Live Concert" on 9 August 2014 at the San Jose State University Event Center and on 10 August at the Orpheum Theatre in downtown Los Angeles.

Accolades

References

External links 
 

Hindi songs
Hindi film songs
Arijit Singh songs
Songs written for films
2014 songs
Songs with music by Jeet Gannguli
Indian songs
Songs with lyrics by Rashmi Singh